The third season of the Mexican sitcom Una familia de diez premiered on October 13, 2019 and concluded on November 24, 2019 on Las Estrellas. Cast changes this season saw Jessica Segura and María Fernanda García depart the series. Series regulars added for the third season include Patricia Martínez as Jacinta, and previous guest star Carlos Ignacio as Carlos.

In this season, the life of the López family will take new and surprising turns. A family member will make a very special trip, never to return, and again they will find themselves in the dilemma of having to leave their department.

Cast 
 Jorge Ortiz de Pinedo as Plácido López
 Eduardo Manzano as Don Arnoldo López
 Zully Keith as Renata González de López
 Carlos Ignacio as Carlos
 Andrea Torre as La Nena
 Mariana Botas as Martina López
 Moisés Iván Mora as Aldolfo
 Camila Rivas as Victoria
 Tadeo Bonavides as Justo "Justito" López
 Daniela Luján as Gaby del Valle de López
 Ricardo Margaleff as Plutarco López
 Patricia Martínez as Jacinta

Episodes

References 

2019 Mexican television seasons